Abdulkareem Al-Muziel (born 1 January 1999) is a Saudi Arabian professional footballer who plays as a right back for Al-Batin.

Career
Al-Muziel began his career at the youth team of Al-Nassr. On 4 September 2019, Al-Muziel signed for Al-Nojoom on loan from Al-Nassr. On 27 June 2020, Al-Muziel joined Al-Jabalain on loan from Al-Nassr. On 25 October 2020, Al-Muziel joined Al-Taawoun on loan from Al-Nassr. On 20 July 2022, Al-Muziel joined Al-Batin on a permanent deal.

References

1999 births
Living people
Saudi Arabian Muslims
Saudi Arabian footballers
Al Nassr FC players
Al-Nojoom FC players
Al-Jabalain FC players
Al-Taawoun FC players
Al Batin FC players
Saudi First Division League players
Saudi Professional League players
Association football fullbacks